Lingaraj Temple Road is a station located in Bhubaneswar city.

The railway station
It has been allotted the code LGTR and functions within the jurisdiction of Khurda Road railway division.

History
Bengal Nagpur Railway was working on both the Howrah–Kharagpur and Kharagpur–Cuttack lines, completed the bridge over the Rupnarayan in 1900 and the Mahanadi in 1901, thus completing the through connection between Chennai and Kolkata.

Electrification
Bhubaneswar Yard and Khurda Road-Bhubaneswar section was electrified in 2001–02. Bhubaneswar-Barang section was electrified in 2002–03.

References

External links
  Trains at Lingaraj Temple Road railway station

Khurda Road railway division
Buildings and structures in Bhubaneswar
Railway stations in Bhubaneswar